Angela Lemaire is an artist printmaker. Specializing in wood engraving, she lives and works in the Scottish Borders. She is a member of the Society of Wood Engravers. Her interests include illustrating ancient texts and poems, illustrating the work of authors or poets by commission and creating artist books. For many years, she collaborated with a specialist fine print publisher, The Old Stile Press, that produced handprinted high quality books. Lemaire  also creates single prints or paintings sometimes to commission.

Early education 

Lemaire was born in Buckinghamshire in 1944 and educated in London and Sussex before traveling to Australia. There she attended Pymble Ladies' College, Sydney, returning to the UK in 1962. In 1963 she trained in London at Chelsea College of Arts, then attended Camberwell College of Arts between 1964-1967, gaining a Diploma in Art and Design. There she studied relief printmaking and became interested in wood engraving. She went on to study etching at Morley College.

Work 

Lemaire's main interest lies in the combination of text and image illustrating literature across the centuries, from Thomas the Rhymer in the 15th century to Ian Hamilton-Finlay in 1992. 

Her work has been exhibited in England, Scotland, and abroad, and can be found in public and private collections internationally. The National Library of Scotland holds an archive of her work which includes book drafts, sketchbooks, correspondence and engravings and the Yale Center for British Art holds many of Lemaire's books and wood engravings.

Selected titles 
The Pyde Piper: Author Richard Verslegan, written in 1634
The Plague: devised by Angela Lemaire with essay by Dr Anthony Dyson  
The Journey of Thomas the Rhymer: Thomas of Earlcdune  written in 13th century
Secret Commonwealth: Robert Kirk written in 1691
Jubilate Agno: Christopher Smart lived (1722 - 1771)
Joys: Thomas Traherne
Christmas Sequence: Benjamin Britten (2008) 
Talking Through Trees: Edward Picton-Turbervill (2016)

References

1944 births
People from the Scottish Borders
Woodcut cutters
Living people
People from Buckinghamshire